Riccardo Moscatelli (1971 in Rome – September 1999) was an Italian race car driver. His career began in 1988 when he took up rallying. Then for the next four years he raced in Italian sports prototypes. In 1993 he raced in Italian Formula Ford and finished 2nd. He then left racing for two years and returned in 1996 in Italian Formula 3. The year after he shared Formula 3 championships in Germany and Italy. He finished in the Italian championship a very low position of 22nd with the Olympia team. He then raced in the 1998 Nissan World Series. He then made a big step into Italian F3000 in 1999 with the Prema Powerteam.

His career, however, was cut short in the September of that year when he died in a mountain bike accident.

1971 births
1999 deaths
Racing drivers from Rome
Italian racing drivers
Auto GP drivers
Italian Formula Three Championship drivers
German Formula Three Championship drivers
Sport deaths in Italy